Damnably is a small independent record label and music publisher based in London, England, which also organises live events and tours for its roster of acts.

History 
The label was founded in 2006 by George Gargan, of the band Former Utopia. He was later joined by filmmaker Janice Li. The label's first release was a single by Former Utopia, and its first high-profile signing was Shonen Knife. The label has specialized in signing international bands, particularly from Asia.

Gargan and Li were married in the late 2010s, and several Damnably artists released songs to commemorate the event. Damnably is a member of the Association of Independent Music and PRS for Music Limited.

Artists
Damnably has released records and/or provided promotion for the following artists:

 Bellini
 Bitch Magnet
 Kath Bloom
 Bottomless Pit
 Chris Brokaw
 Codeine
 Dick Dale
 Julie Doiron
 Drinking Boys and Girls Choir
 Geoff Farina
 Former Utopia
 David Grubbs
 Hazy Sour Cherry
 MJ Hibbett
 Joel RL Phelps and the Downer Trio
 Lazarus Clamp
 Lonelady
 PW Long
 Jason Molina
 Otoboke Beaver
 Say Sue Me
 Scrawl
 Benjamin Shaw
 Shonen Knife
 Spraydog
 Stinking Lizaveta
 Damo Suzuki
 Thee More Shallows
 Uzeda
 Shannon Wright
 Wussy

References

Companies based in London